Wang Da (1881-1946) was a politician of the Republic of China. He was born in Xuancheng, Anhui. He was the 5th Republican mayor of Beijing.

References

Bibliography
 
 
 
 

1881 births
1946 deaths
Republic of China politicians from Anhui
Mayors of Beijing
Politicians from Xuancheng
People from Jing County, Anhui